Northglenn/112th station (sometimes stylized as Northglenn•112th) is a station on the N Line of the Denver RTD commuter rail system in Northglenn, Colorado. It is located on the west side of York and north of 112th Avenue. The station opened on September 21, 2020.

References

RTD commuter rail stations
Railway stations in the United States opened in 2020
2020 establishments in Colorado